Parnassius tianschanicus, the large keeled Apollo, is a high-altitude butterfly. It is a member of the snow Apollo genus (Parnassius) of the swallowtail family, Papilionidae.

Range
It is found in Uzbekistan, Tajikistan and Kyrgyzstan. Afghanistan, Pakistan, south-western China and Xinjiang, reported from northern India (Jammu and Kashmir) by some authors by mistake.

Status
Locally very common but generally a rare butterfly. It is declining due to changes in its habitat and is thus considered to be vulnerable. More information is needed on this species.

See also
Papilionidae
List of butterflies of India
List of butterflies of India (Papilionidae)

References
 
 
 
 Sakai S., Inaoka S., Toshiaki A., Yamaguchi S., Watanabe Y., (2002) The Parnassiology. The Parnassius Butterflies, A Study in Evolution, Kodansha, Japan.
 Weiss J.-C., (2005) Parnassiinae of the World - Part 4, Hillside Books, Canterbury, UK.

External links
Goran Waldeck's Parnassius Site (includes tianschanicus photo and map) 

Fauna of Pakistan
tianschanicus
Butterflies described in 1879